West Rasen is a village and civil parish in the West Lindsey district of Lincolnshire, England.

 The population is included in the civil parish of Osgodby.

The name 'Rasen' derives from the Old English ræsn meaning 'at the planks' probably indicating a bridge over the River Rasen.

The parish church is a Grade I listed building dedicated to All Saints, dating from the 11th century, and built from ironstone. The font is 15th-century, and the former north aisle chapel was a chantry founded in 1373 for John Pouger and dissolved in 1548. 
The churchyard cross is 14th-century, although it was restored in the 19th century, and is both Grade II listed and a scheduled monument.

Packhorse Bridge is a Grade II*  ironstone listed bridge over the River Rase, which dates from the 15th century with 20th-century alterations. It consists of a narrow bridge with 3 arches and cobbled surface. It is a scheduled monument.

The Post Office is a Grade II listed former cottage, now shop and house, dating from the late 17th century with 20th-century alterations and additions. It is likely to have been mud and stud originally, but is now underbuilt in red brick with a thatched roof.

References

External links

Civil parishes in Lincolnshire
Villages in Lincolnshire
West Lindsey District